Cannon River may refer to:

Cannon River (Minnesota), USA, a tributary of Mississippi River
Cannon River (Queensland), Australia, a tributary of Langlo River

See also 
 Little Cannon River (disambiguation)